Monastero di Vasco is a comune (municipality) in the Province of Cuneo in the Italian region Piedmont, located about  south of Turin and about  east of Cuneo.

Monastero di Vasco borders the following municipalities: Frabosa Soprana, Frabosa Sottana, Mondovì, Montaldo di Mondovì, Vicoforte, and Villanova Mondovì.

References

External links 
 Official website

Cities and towns in Piedmont